Serpil İskenderoğlu (born July 15, 1982) is a Turkish handballer in the field player position. She is a member of the Turkish national team.

She began with handball playing in her early age in 1997 at the T.M.O. SK in Ankara. During her university years, İskenderoğlu was a member of the Anadolu University SK between 2003 and 2006. Then, the German club 1. FC Nürnberg transferred her for one  season in 2006–2007. After returning home, she played for Üsküdar Belediyespor in Istanbul before she transferred to İzmir Büyükşehir Belediyespor. Three seasons later in 2011–2012, she joined the Muratpaşa Bld. SK in Antalya. In July 2015, she was transferred by Kastamonu Bld. GSK for the 2015–16 season.

Honors

National
 2001-2002 T.M.O. SK TWHSL 
 2003-2004 Anadolu University S.K.  TWHSL 
 2003-2004 Anadolu University S.K.  TWHC 
 2004-2005 Anadolu University S.K.  TWHSL 
 2004-2005 Anadolu University S.K.  TWHC 
 2005-2006 Anadolu University S.K.  TWHSL 
 2010-2011 İzmir Büyükşehir Belediyespor TWHSL 
 2011-2012 Muratpaşa Bld. SK TWHSL 
Legend:
 TWHSL Turkish Women's Handball Super League
 TWHC Turkish Women's Handball Cup

International
She was the member of the national team that won the silver medal at the 2009 Mediterranean Games in Pescara, Italy.

İskenderoğlu became the second most scorer player with 45 goals in six matches at the Group 4 2012 European Women's Handball Championship qualification.

References

External links
 EHF profile

1982 births
Living people
Sportspeople from Istanbul
Turkish female handball players
Expatriate handball players
Turkish expatriate sportspeople in Germany
Anadolu University alumni
Üsküdar Belediyespor players
İzmir Büyükşehir Belediyespor handball players
Muratpaşa Bld. SK (women's handball) players
Turkey women's national handball players
Kastamonu Bld. SK (women's handball) players
Mediterranean Games silver medalists for Turkey
Competitors at the 2005 Mediterranean Games
Competitors at the 2009 Mediterranean Games
Mediterranean Games medalists in handball
21st-century Turkish women